Parakneria cameronensis is a benthopelagic species of tropical fish. The species can grow up to  8.3 cm, and are commonly found in the Congo River. The fish has a projectile upper jaw and subterminal mouth. The species' common name is Cameroon shellear.

References

Tropical fish
cameronensis
Freshwater fish of Central Africa
Congo drainage basin
Fish described in 1909